Mark Fauser is an American actor, director, screenwriter, and producer who currently operates the  independent film movie studio, Overlook Productions.

He has written several teleplays, plays, and movies, and has done major studio rewrites for companies such as Universal Studios, Paramount Pictures, Columbia Pictures and CBS Television. In 2002 his movie It's All About You (starring John D'Aquino) was the "Winner for Best Comedy" at the 2001 Beverly Hills Film Festival.

Selected works
Actor
Waking Up in Reno (2002) .... Boyd
It's All About You (2002) .... Mark
Journey of Redemption (2002) .... Doug
Madison (2001) .... Travis
Between the Sheets (1998) .... Nasal reporter
JAG (TV) ("Recovery") (1996) .... Captain Matthews
Coach (TV) ("The Popcorn Bowl") (1994) .... Reporter No. 1
seaQuest DSV (TV) (1993/1994) (Recurring character) .... Lieutenant Dalton Phillips
The New WKRP in Cincinnati (TV) (2 episodes) (1992/1993) .... Fire Captain
Evening Shade (TV) (4 episodes) (1991–1992) .... Bill
Quantum Leap (TV) (Moments to Live By) (1992) .... Policeman
Freeze Frame (TV) (1992) .... Sonny

Director
It's All About You (Film and Play)

Writer:
Movies
Waking Up in Reno (2002)
It's All About You (2002)
The Right To Remain Silent (TV) (1996) (teleplay)
Evening Shade (TV) ("Mama Knows Best" and "Educating Calvin") (1994)

Plays
It's All About You
Pa's Funeral
The Right To Remain Silent
The King of Cool (A Tribute To James Dean)

Producer
It's All About You (Film and Play)

References

External links

Year of birth missing (living people)
Living people
American male television actors
American male film actors
American film directors
American film producers
American male screenwriters